Acacia plautella is a shrub belonging to the genus Acacia and the subgenus Phyllodineae that is endemic to a small area along the coast of western Australia.

Description
It has glabrous branchlets with a white epidermis that exfoliates as it ages and with caducous stipules. Like most species of Acacia it has phyllodes rather than true leaves. It produces yellow flowers. The rudimentary inflorescences usually occur on single headed racemes and have spherical flower-heads containing 15 to 20 golden coloured flowers.

Taxonomy
The species was first formally described by the botanist Bruce Maslin in 1999 as part of the work Acacia miscellany. The taxonomy of fifty-five species of Acacia, primarily Western Australian, in section Phyllodineae. as published in the journal Nuytsia. It was reclassified as Racosperma plautellum by Leslie Pedley in 2003 and then transferred back to genus Acacia in 2014.

Distribution

See also
 List of Acacia species

References

plautella
Acacias of Western Australia
Taxa named by Bruce Maslin
Plants described in 1999